The 111th Attack Squadron (111 ATKS) is a unit of the Texas Air National Guard 147th Attack Wing located at Ellington Field Joint Reserve Base, Houston, Texas. The 111th is equipped with the General Atomics MQ-9 Reaper unmanned aerial vehicle (UAV).

The squadron is a descendant organization of the World War I 111th Aero Squadron, established on 14 August 1917. It was reformed on 29 June 1923, as the 111th Observation Squadron, and is one of the 29 original National Guard Observation Squadrons of the United States Army National Guard formed before World War II.

The 111th Attack Squadron is the oldest unit of the Texas Air National Guard, with over 95 years of service to the State of Texas and the United States.

History

World War I
The Texas Air National Guard began as the 111th Aero Squadron on 14 August 1917 at Kelly Field in San Antonio, TX. The unit, composed of teamsters and laborers, was on special duty at Kelly Field and was known as the "Post Headquarters Squadron." The squadron was demobilized 19 August 1919.

Texas National Guard
The unit was reorganized with the establishment of a permanent air service in 1920, forming in the old Houston Light Guard Armory. The 111th Observation Squadron received Federal Recognition on 29 June 1923, as part of the 36th Division, Texas Air National Guard.

The squadron had no airplanes, so the hot summer of 1923 was devoted to close-order drill and classroom sessions. That was remedied, however, in September of that year when the 111th became airborne in the Curtiss JN-6H Jenny.

In September 1927 the Curtiss JN-6Hs were retired and the squadron gained Consolidated PT-1s and several other trainers until June 1928 when new Douglas O-2H observation aircraft arrived. During the next 10 years, the 111th performed outstanding civic service to the State of Texas, dropping medicine and relief supplies to many of the towns that were isolated by floodwaters, tornados, and fires. New Douglas O-38 observation planes were received in January 1931. By 1938 the squadron was flying both Douglas Douglas O-43As and North American O-47s.

World War II

With the onset of World War II, the unit was called into federal service 25 November 1940 and trained with the 36th Division at Brownwood Airfield Texas until Pearl Harbor was bombed, it was sent to the Mexican border, Fort Clark Springs Texas. The border patrol was short, and on 14 February 1942, the squadron left Texas for Daniel Field in Augusta, Georgia, and became part of the 68th Observation Group. Pilots trained on Douglas O-43A, Vultee/Stinson O-49/L-1 Vigilant and Douglas A-20B Havoc aircraft in preparation for deployment to the European Theater of Operations (ETO).

In 1942 the ground echelon and some pilots made their way to Scotland then England in preparation for landing on the Algerian beaches as part of Operation Torch, their shiny new P-39 Airacobras had to be assembled and tested before flying from England to Algeria. Some of the pilots of the 68th Group flew their A-20s directly across the Atlantic on the "Southern Route" and immediately began flying over the Mediterranean in anti-submarine patrols, sinking at least one submarine. As the invasion force moved inland, the three squadrons of the group divided up the A-20s and P-39s by squadron and the 111th took on the Fighter Reconnaissance role in the P-39.

In March 1943, the 111th left the 68th Group to defend against a possible invasion of French Morocco from Spanish Morocco while the rest of the group was selected to support the Tunisian Campaign of the Army's II Corps. In June 1943 the newly redesignated 111th Tactical Reconnaissance Squadron, flying Allison engined F-6A or F-6B Mustangs (taken from a British order of Mk IAs), became the eyes of the 7th Army in Sicily, Operation Husky. They were temporarily assigned to the 5th Army in Italy for the invasion of Salerno, "the 111th Fighter Reconnaissance Squadron had been trained to spot naval gunfire". They returned in July 1944 in time to support the 7th Army's invasion of southern France, Operation Dragoon. In addition to the older F-6A/F-6B Mustangs, they began receiving F-6C Mustangs (the photo recon version of the P-51C). The 111th remained with the 7th Army through the end of the war. From VE Day until December 1945, the Squadron served in the occupation force, and conducted postwar photo-mapping of the devastation in France.

During 23 months of continuous combat flying, from June 1943 through May 1945, the 111th Tactical Reconnaissance Squadron flew 3,840 reconnaissance missions. While keeping Army Headquarters informed of enemy movements, the 111th destroyed 44 enemy aircraft, damaged 29 others and claimed 12 probable kills. The squadron received eight Battle Stars, a Distinguished Unit Citation, and the French Croix de Guerre for its World War II accomplishments.

Texas Air National Guard

The wartime 111th Tactical Reconnaissance Squadron was re-designated as the 111th Fighter Squadron, and was allotted to the Texas Air National Guard, on 24 May 1946. It was organized at the Houston Municipal Airport and was extended federal recognition on 27 January 1947 by the National Guard Bureau. The 111th Fighter Squadron was bestowed the lineage, history, honors, and colors of the 111th Tactical Reconnaissance Squadron and all predecessor units. The squadron was assigned to the Texas Air National Guard 136th Fighter Group and was equipped with F-51D Mustangs.

The mission of the squadron was the air defense of Texas. During the postwar years, the 111th primarily trained over the southern and eastern parts of the state; the 181st Fighter Squadron, based at Love Field, Dallas, and covered the south east, and the 182d Fighter Squadron, based at Brooks AFB, near San Antonio covered the Hill Country and west Texas.

Korean War activation
As a result of the Korean War, the Texas Air National Guard was federalized and placed on active-duty status on 10 October 1950, being assigned to Ninth Air Force, Tactical Air Command (TAC). TAC ordered the 136th Fighter Group to Langley Air Force Base, Virginia, where the unit was re-designated to a Fighter-Bomber unit, and its status was changed to a Wing. At Langley, the 136th Fighter-Bomber Wing consisted of the following units:
 111th Fighter-Bomber Squadron
 182d Fighter-Bomber Squadron
 154th Fighter-Bomber Squadron (Arkansas ANG).

At Langley AFB, the 136th trained with their F-51D Mustangs. Unfortunately losing two 111th FBS pilots in a training accident on 15 December. A third pilot was killed on 27 January 1951 in another accident. In February 1951, the aged F-51Ds that the unit had been flying since its activation in 1947 were replaced by F-84E Thunderjets, and the squadron began transition training on the jet fighter-bomber. Most of the training took place at Langley, although some pilots were sent to Shaw AFB, South Carolina. Maintenance crews, all new to jet aircraft, were trained at Langley and engine specialists were sent to the Allison plant in Indianapolis. Assigned to the Arkansas ANG 154th FBS at the time was a Navy exchange pilot, future NASA astronaut Lt. Walter Schirra (who happened to be the only pilot assigned to the 136th at the time who was a qualified jet pilot).

In May 1951, less than seven months later, the Wing was deployed to Japan, being attached to Far East Air Force and stationed at Itazuke Air Force Base, the first echelon of the 136th arriving on 18 May. The 136th replaced the Strategic Air Command 27th Fighter-Escort Wing, which had deployed to Far East Air Force in the early days of the Korean War. At Itazuke, the squadrons took over the F-84Es of the 27th FEW, which remained in place, its aircraft being reassigned from SAC to Far East Air Force inventory records. On 2 June, the final elements of the 136th arrived in Japan, the National Guardsmen officially relieved the 27th FBW and the SAC airmen departed for the United States. The 136th was the first Air National Guard Wing in history to enter combat.

From Japan the Wing engaged in combat operations over South Korea, however flying in the North Pacific area was a challenge to the wing, losing seven F-84Es in non-combat operations and three in combat. On 26 June, in one of the largest air-to-air battles in Korea, two 182d FBS pilots, Captain Harry Underwood and 1st LT Arthur Olighter shot down an enemy MiG-15 that broke through an F-86 Sabre escort of four B-29s. Two other 111th FBS pilots, 1st Lt John Morse and John Marlins scored probables in the same encounter. These were the first combat victories by Air National Guard pilots. On 3 July the 136th sent their aircraft to North Korea, attacking FLAK batteries in downtown Pyongyang while other aircraft attacked North Korean airfields.

However, the short-legged F-84 had limited combat time over Korea, therefore on 16 November 1951 the Wing moved to Taegu Air Force Base (K-2) in South Korea for its combat operations. In 1952, the 136th was re-equipped with the F-84G Thunderjet, designed for tactical close air support of ground forces.

The squadron flew over 6,000 escort, interdiction, and close air support sorties for the United Nations Troops and 111th Fighter-Bomber Squadron pilots destroyed at least two Mikoyan-Gurevich MiG-15 fighter jets.

The 111th Fighter-Bomber Squadron returned to the Houston Municipal Airport without aircraft or personnel in July 1952 and began to rebuild. In July 1956 the F-80 Shooting Stars of the 111th Fighter Squadron went on "Dawn to Dusk" alert at the Houston Municipal Airport.

Air Defense Command

With the 111th's return from the Korean War, the 111th was re-equipped with the Very Long Range (VLR) F-51H Mustang, which had been developed to escort B-29 Superfortress bombers in the Pacific Theater from the Mariana Islands to the Japanese Home Islands. The F-51H would allow the squadron to intercept any unidentified aircraft over any part of Texas. The squadron became part of Air Defense Command (ADC) and resumed its postwar mission of Texas air defense.

It wasn't until 1955 that the squadron received jets from ADC, receiving F-80B and F-80C Shooting Stars and being re-designated as a Fighter-Interceptor Squadron. The 111th received F-80C-11 (modified F-80A to F-80C standards) Shooting Stars on 1 July 1955, and on 1 July 1956 the 111th FIS commenced to participate in the active ADC runway alert program at Ellington AFB.

With the squadron's conversion from the obsolescent F-80-day fighters to the all-weather/day/night F-86D Sabre Interceptor in 1957, plans were made to reorganize the 600-man Augmented Squadron to an Air Defense Command group structure. On 1 July 1957, the 111th was authorized to expand to a group level, and the 147th Fighter-Interceptor Group was established by the National Guard Bureau. The 111th FIS becoming the group's flying squadron. Other squadrons assigned into the group were the 147th Headquarters, 147th Material Squadron (Maintenance), 147th Combat Support Squadron, and the 147th USAF Dispensary. In June 1959 the squadron traded their F-86Ds for the upgraded F-86L Sabre Interceptor with uprated afterburning engines and new electronics.

In August 1960 the unit became one of the first to transition to the F-102A Delta Dagger Mach-2 all-weather interceptor and began a 24-hour alert to guard the Texas Gulf coast. On 1 January 1970, the squadron was re-designated as the 111th Combat Crew Training Squadron and served as the Air National Guard's RTU (Replacement Training Unit) for the TF/F-102A. In 1971, when the active-duty force ceased F-102A training and closed Perrin AFB, Texas on 30 June 1971, the Houston-based 111th FIS became the Replacement Training Unit (RTU) for all Air Defense Command F-102 pilots, and the squadron received several TF-102A dual-seat trainers which were transferred from Perrin AFB while also retaining the T-33A instrument training function.

One pilot who flew TF/F-102As with the 111th was 1st Lt. George W. Bush, a future Governor of Texas and future President of the United States. George W. Bush's military service began in 1968 when he enlisted in the Texas Air National Guard after graduating with a bachelor's degree in history from Yale University. After being accepted into the ANG, Airman Basic Bush was selected to attend pilot training even though his test scores were the lowest acceptable for that position. His six weeks of basic training was completed at Lackland AFB in Texas during July and August 1968. Upon its completion, Bush was promoted to the officer's rank of second lieutenant required for pilot candidates. He spent the next year in flight school at Moody AFB in Georgia from November 1968 to November 1969.  Bush then returned to Ellington AFB in Texas to complete seven months of combat crew training on the F-102 from December 1969 to June 1970. This period included five weeks of training on the T-33 Shooting Star and 16 weeks aboard the TF-102A Delta Dagger two-seat trainer and finally the single-seat F-102A. Bush graduated from the training program in June 1970. Lt. Bush remained in the Texas ANG as a certified F-102 pilot who participated in frequent drills and alerts through April 1972.  Lt. Bush was honorably discharged from the Air National Guard in October 1973 at the rank of First Lieutenant. An ANG physical dated 15 May 1971 indicates that he had logged 625 flight hours by that time, and he ultimately completed 326 hours as pilot and 10 as co-pilot while serving with the 111th Fighter-Interceptor Squadron.

In May 1971, the 111th added F-101B/F Voodoos and became the RTU tar the twin seat F-101F type, while continuing as the F-102 Delta Dagger RTU. In January 1975, after 14 years of service, the unit's F-102s were retired, but the unit maintained a full fleet of F-101s.

The 111th also operated detachment 1 of the 147th FIW at New Orleans. The detachment was apart from the squadron in that it maintained constant alert status whilst facing towards Cuba.

Tactical Air Command

In October 1979, in as part of the inactivation of Aerospace Defense Command, the USAF gained command responsibilities which shifted to Tactical Air Command (TAC) and a sub-organization equivalent to a numbered air force designated as Air Defense, Tactical Air Command (ADTAC). In 1982, the F-101s were retired and ADTAC re-equipped the 111th with the McDonnell F-4C Phantom II and continued its air defense mission. Most of the F-4Cs the squadron received were Vietnam War veteran aircraft. In November 1986, the F-4Cs were replaced by later-model F-4Ds.

In December 1989 the 111th FIS started receiving block 15 F-16C/D Fighting Falcon aircraft to replace their F-4Ds. The last F-16 arrived in April 1990.

Post Cold War era
In 1992, only a few years following the acceptance of their block 15s, they converted to the ADF variant of the block 15. On 15 March 15, 1992 the 111th FIS was re-designated the 111th Fighter Squadron when its parent 147th Fighter Group converted to the USAF Objective Organization plan. Also in 1992 the 111th FS celebrated their 75th anniversary. To commemorate this F-16A ADF #82-1001 was painted in special markings including a big Texas flag painted on the fuselage underside. During September 1995, the 111th FS ended its alert detachment in New Orleans with the F-101 Voodoo, also the 147th was upgraded to a Wing, with the 111th Fighter Squadron being assigned to the new 147th Operations Group.

In late 1996 the 111th started to retire their ADF F-16s to AMARC. To replace these aircraft the squadron received the block 25 F-16C/D Fighting Falcon. Transition started in September 1996 and was completed by February 1997. This brought a change in role which officially happened in October 1998. The role went from air-to-air to an air-to-ground mission. After returning from an Operation Southern Watch mission at Prince Sultan Air Base, Saudi Arabia in October 2000, the squadron added Precision Guided Munitions to its arsenal.

Global War on Terrorism

Following the 11 September 2001 terrorist attacks, four 111th Fighter Squadron aircraft were launched to escort President George W. Bush, onboard Air Force 1 from Florida to Louisiana, Nebraska and finally back to Washington DC that same day. December 2001 saw the 111th deploy to Atlantic City, New Jersey, to fly Air Defense Combat Air Patrol missions over New York, Philadelphia and Washington DC in support of Operation Noble Eagle.

In August 2005 components of the 111th Fighter Squadron and 147th Fighter Wing deployed to Balad Airbase, Iraq to conduct combat operations in support of Operation Iraqi Freedom and the Global War on Terrorism. The men and women of the 111th FS/147th FW once again distinguished themselves by flying 462 sorties and almost 1,900 hours in a two-month span; with a perfect record of 100% maintenance delivery (zero missed sorties), 100% mission effectiveness, and 100% weapons employment/hits under the most challenging combat conditions.

In April 2007, components of the 111th Fighter Squadron and 147th Fighter Wing again deployed to Balad Airbase, Iraq in support of Operation Iraqi Freedom and the Global War on Terrorism, where the men and women of the 111th FS/147th FW continued their distinguished combat tradition. On this deployment the 111th Fighter Squadron flew 348 tasked sorties, plus six no-notice Close Air Support (CAS) alert scrambles and four short-notice (less than 30-minute & not on the ATO) pre-planned alert launches. With an average combat sortie lasting almost 4.42 hours, the unit accumulated a total of 1537.1 combat hours. Maintenance delivery effectiveness for this deployment was an astonishing 102% due to the inclusion of the unscheduled CAS scrambles. Mission effectiveness and weapons employment were both once again a perfect 100%.

90th Anniversary

In November 2007, an F-16C Fighting Falcon from the Texas Air National Guard's 111th Fighter Squadron received a special paint job in honor of the squadron's 90th anniversary.

All the colors and markings have specific meanings, reflecting the unit's nine-decade history. The rudder is painted like a JN-4 Jenny, which the squadron flew in the 1920s. The schemes for the wings and flaps recall the paint schemes of the pre-World War II era.

The blue fuselage represents the Korean War, in which the squadron earned credit for two air victories. The gray underside represents the jet age.

The "N5 A" was the insignia the squadron's P-51 Mustangs sported during World War II, in which the squadron claimed 44 air victories. Also representing World War II is the star on the fuselage, while the star on the wing represents the pre-World War II era.

"Ace in the Hole" and the star on the tail replicate the markings of the squadron's F-84s during the Korean War. The ventral fin, partially obscured, reads "Est. 1917."

BRAC 2005 reorganization
During the 2005 Base Realignment and Closure Commission, it was recommended that the F-16 block 25s be retired. Texas Governor, Rick Perry, reacted quickly and made sure the unit could remain alive and did so by securing MQ-1 Predator operations. This is an unmanned aircraft and although not exactly what the 111th FS had hoped for, it would keep the unit going well into the future.

As was earlier planned in 2005, the 111th FS gave up its last two F-16s on 7 June 2008 and F-16 operations drew to a close. The MQ-1 replaced the F-16 and the parent wing was renamed the 147th Reconnaissance Wing that same month.

Lineage

 Organized as 111th Aero Squadron** on 14 August 1917
 Re-designated as 111th Aero Squadron (Supply) on 1 September 1917
 Re-designated 632d Aero Squadron (Supply) on 1 February 1918
 Demobilized on 19 August 1919
 Re-constituted and consolidated (1936) with 111th Observation Squadron which, having been allotted to Texas NG, was activated on 29 June 1923
 Ordered to active service on 25 November 1940
 Re-designated: 111th Observation Squadron (Medium) on 13 January 1942
 Re-designated: 111th Observation Squadron on 4 July 1942
 Re-designated: 111th Reconnaissance Squadron (Fighter) on 31 May 1943
 Re-designated: 111th Tactical Reconnaissance Squadron on 13 November 1943
 Inactivated on 15 December 1945
 Re-designated: 111th Fighter Squadron, and allotted to Texas ANG, on 24 May 1946.
 Extended federal recognition on 27 January 1947
 Federalized and ordered to active service on: 10 October 1950
 Re-designated: 111th Fighter-Bomber Squadron, 19 April 1951
 Released from active duty and returned to Texas state control, 10 July 1952
 Re-designated: 111th Fighter-Bomber Squadron, 10 July 1952
 Re-designated: 111th Fighter Interceptor Squadron, 1 July 1955
 Re-designated: 111th Combat Crew Training Squadron, 1 January 1970
 Re-designated: 111th Fighter Interceptor Squadron, 1 October 1982
 Re-designated: 111th Fighter Squadron, 10 March 1992
 Components designated as: 111th Expeditionary Fighter Squadron when deployed as part of an Air and Space Expeditionary unit after June 1996
 Re-designated: 111th Reconnaissance Squadron, 1 July 2008
Re-designated: 111th Attack Squadron', 2017

** This unit is not related to another 111th Aero Squadron (Service) that was activated in April 1918 at Rich Field, Waco, Texas.

Assignments
 Post Headquarters, Kelly Field, 14 August 1917 – 19 August 1919
 Texas National Guard (divisional aviation, 36th Division), 29 June 1923
 Eighth Corps Area, 25 November 1940
 United States Third Army, c. Dec 1940
 VIII Army Corps, c. Mar 1941
 United States Third Army, c. Jun 1941
 III Air Support Command, 1 September 1941
 Attached to: 68th Observation Group from Feb 1942
 Eighth Air Force, 16 March 1942
 68th Observation (later Reconnaissance; Tactical Reconnaissance) Group, 29 March 1942
 Attached to: XII Air Support [later Tactical Air] Command, 12–31 Mar 1943, 20 June 1943 – 26 May 1944
 Attached to: 3d Air Defense [later 64th Fighter] Wing for operations, Jun–Sep 1943
 XII Tactical Air Command, 26 May 1944
 Attached to Provisional Reconnaissance Group, 16 October 1944
 69th Tactical Reconnaissance (later Reconnaissance) Group, 20 April 1945
 10th Reconnaissance Group, 2 Jul – 15 December 1945.
 136th Fighter Group, 27 January 1947
 136th Fighter-Interceptor Group, 20 July 1952
 136th Fighter-Bomber Group, 1 January 1953
 147th Fighter-Interceptor Group, 1 July 1957
 147th Fighter Group, 10 March 1992
 147th Operations Group, 1 October 1995–present

Stations

 Kelly Field, Texas, 14 August 1917 – 19 August 1919
 Ellington Field, Texas, 29 June 1923
 Houston Municipal Airport, Texas, 1927
 Brownwood Army Airfield, Texas, 12 January 1941
 Camp Clark, Texas, Dec 1941
 Daniel Field, Georgia, 19 February 1942
 Morris Field, North Carolina, 9 Jul – 22 September 1942
 RAF Wattisham (AAF-377), England, 3–21 Oct 1942
 Saint-Leu Airfield, Algeria, 10 November 1942
 Oran Tafaraoui Airport, Algeria 16 November 1942
 Oujda Airfield, French Morocco, 19 December 1942
 Detachment operated from Oran Es Sénia Airport, Algeria 11–27 Feb 1943
 Guercif Airfield, French Morocco, 4 April 1943
 Nouvion Airfield, Algeria, 27 May 1943
 Air echelon at Bou Ficha Airfield, Tunisia, c. 20 Jun – 2 July 1943
 Tunis Airfield, Tunisia, 3 July 1943
 Air echelon at: Korba Airfield, Tunisia, 2–14 Jul 1943
 Air echelon at: Ponte Olivo, Sicily, 14–16 Jul 1943
 Ponte Olivo Airfield, Sicily, 16 July 1943
 Gela Airfield, Sicily, 19 July 1943
 Termini Airfield, Sicily, 11 August 1943
 Detachment operated from Gela Airfield, Sicily, to 2 September 1943
 San Antonio Airfield, Sicily, 1 September 1943
 Sele Airfield, Italy, 16 September 1943
 Detachment operated from: San Antonio Airfield, Sicily, to 30 September 1943
 Detachment operated from: Capodichino Airport, Naples, Italy, 30 Sep-14 Oct 1943

 Pomigliano Airfield, Italy, 5 October 1943
 Detachment operated from: Santa Maria Airfield, Italy, 18 Apr – 6 June 1944
 Santa Maria Airfield, Italy, 9 May 1944
 Nettuno Airfield, Italy, 6 June 1944
 Galera Airfield, Italy, 11 June 1944
 Voltone Airfield, Italy, 18 June 1944
 Follonica Airfield, Italy, 2 July 1944
 Borgo Airfield, Corsica, 21 Ju1 1944
 Detachment operated from: Santa Maria Airfield, Italy, 21 Jul – 9 August 1944
 Detachment operated from: St Maxime and Grimaud, France, 15–21 Aug 1944
 Detachment operated from: St. Raphael/Frejus Airfield (Y-12), France, after 21 August 1944
 St. Raphael/Frejus Airfield (Y-12), France, 27 August 1944
 Valance Airfield (Y-23), France, 5 September 1944
 Satolas-et-Bonce Airfield (MTO), France, 9 September 1944
 Dijon Airfield (Y-9), France, 23 September 1944
 Nancy-Azelot Airfield (Y-80), France, 30 October 1944
 Haguenau Airfield (Y-39), France, 2 April 1945
 AAF Station Fürth, Germany, 1 July 1945
 Creil, France, 15 Oct-15 Dec 1945
 Houston Municipal Airport, Texas, 27 January 1947
 Ellington Air Force Base, Houston, Texas, 1956
 Ellington Air National Guard Base, Houston, Texas, 1 July 1976
 Designated: Ellington Field Joint Reserve Base, Houston, Texas, 1991–Present

Known deployments

 Korean War Federalization
 Operated from: Langley Air Force Base, Virginia, 24 October 1950 – 13 May 1951
 Operated from: Itazuke Air Base, Japan, 15 May 1951
 Operated from: Taegu Air Base (K-2), South Korea, 16 November 1951 – 9 July 1952
 Operation Southern Watch (AEF)
 Operated from: Ahmad al-Jaber Air Base, Kuwait 1997 (6 F-16s)

 Operation Southern Watch (AEF)
 Operated from: Prince Sultan Air Base, Saudi Arabia, October-15 November 2000
 Operation Iraqi Freedom (AEF)
 Operated from: Balad Air Base, Iraq, August–October 2005
 Operated from: Balad Air Base, Iraq, April–June 2007

Aircraft

 Included JN-4, TW-3, PT-1, PT-3, BT-1, 0-2, and 0-17 during period 1923–1931
 Douglas O-38, 1931–1935
 Douglas O-43, 1935–1942
 North American O-47, C. 1939–1942
 O-49 Vigilant, 1941–1942
 Douglas O-9, 1941–1942
 O-59 Grasshopper, 1941–1942
 F-3A Havoc, 1942–1943
 P-39F-2 Airacobra, 1943
 Spitfire PR XI, 1943
 F-4 Lightning, 1943
 F-6 Mustang, 1943–1945
 A-36 Apache, 1943–1944
 UC-64A Norseman, 1945
 L-5 Sentinel, 1945

 F-51D Mustang, 1947–1951
 F-84E Thunderjet, 1951–1952
 F-84G Thunderjet, 1952
 F-51H Mustang, 1952–1955
 F-80 Shooting Star, 1955–1957
 F-86D Sabre Interceptor, 1957–1959
 F-86L Sabre Interceptor, 1959–1960
 TF/F-102A Delta Dagger, 1960–1975
 F-101B/F Voodoo, 1971–1982
 RF-4C Phantom II, 1974
 F-4C Phantom II, 1982–1987
 F-4D Phantom II, 1987–1989
 Block 15 F-16A/B Fighting Falcon, 1989–1996
 Block 25 F-16C/D Fighting Falcon, 1996–2008
 MQ-1B Predator, 2008–2017
 MQ-9 Reaper, 2017-Present

Support Aircraft

C-26B Metroliner (1991–2007)
C-26A Metroliner (1989–1995)
C-131B Samaritan (1978–1989) (Miss Piggy)
VT-29D Samaritan (1974–1978)
Cessna U-3A (1970–1974)
C-54 Skymaster (1967–1974)
T-33A Shooting Star (1951–1987), (1957–1962) (18 aircraft for the Jet Instruction School)
C-47 Skytrain (1947–1967)
B-26 Invader (1947–1950) (Target tug)
L-5 Sentinel (1947–1951)

Republic P-43 Lancer (1942) (State-side training)
P-40 Warhawk (1942) (State-side training)
BC-1A Texan (1940–1941)
O-17 Courier (1928–1933) – supplemented O-2Hs, later modified-the PT-3 standard and kept as trainers
PT-1 Trusty (1927)
Huff-Daland TW-5 (1924–1926)
PT-1 Trusty (1924–1926)
Vought VE-7 Bluebird (1924–1926)
Airco DH-4B (1924–1926) – single aircraft assigned-the Unit Instructor

See also

 List of American aero squadrons
 List of observation squadrons of the United States Army National Guard

References

 Air Defense Aircraft
 Ross, Steven T. U.S. War Plans 1938–1945. Boulder, Colorado: Lynne Rienner, 2002. .
 Rottman, Gordon L. Korean War Order of Battle: United States, United Nations, and Communist Ground, Naval, and Airforces, 1950–1953.  Westport Connecticut: Praeger, 2002. .
 Scutts, Jerry. Mustang Aces of the Ninth & 15th Airforces and the RAF. London: Osprey, 1995. .
 Tucker, Spencer C., Kim, Jinwung, Nichols, Michael R., Pierpaoli, Paul G. Jr., Roberts, Priscilla D. and Zehr, Norman R., eds. Encyclopedia of the Korean War: A Political, Social, and Military History. Oxford, UK: ABC-Clio Inc., 2000. .
 Rogers, B. (2006). United States Air Force Unit Designations Since 1978. 
  Cornett, Lloyd H. and Johnson, Mildred W., A Handbook of Aerospace Defense Organization  1946–1980, Office of History, Aerospace Defense Center, Peterson AFB, CO (1980). 
 Maurer, Maurer. Combat Squadrons of the Air Force: World War II''. Maxwell Air Force Base, Alabama: Office of Air Force History, 1982.

External links

 147th Fighter Wing History
 Texas Military Museum

Squadrons of the United States Air National Guard
Military units and formations in Texas
111
Ellington Airport (Texas)